Events from the year 1996 in Jordan.

Incumbents
Monarch: Hussein 
Prime Minister: Zaid ibn Shaker (until 4 February), Abdul Karim al-Kabariti (starting 4 February)

Events

Sports

1996 AFC Asian Cup qualification
1995–96 Jordan League
1996–97 Jordan League

See also

 Years in Iraq
 Years in Syria
 Years in Saudi Arabia

References

 
1990s in Jordan
Jordan
Jordan
Years of the 20th century in Jordan